Harry Heijnen (17 October 194018 March 2015) was a Dutch football player.

Club career
Nicknamed Mandje, Heijnen made his debut on 23 August 1959 for hometown club FC VVV with whom he won the Dutch Cup in 1959 and left them in 1962 for a lengthy spell at ADO. He was one of the ADO players to enjoy a 3-month spell in the USA as the Golden Gate Gales, alongside Dick Advocaat among others.

In 1969, he moved to MVV for 50,000 Dutch guilders before returning to VVV to finish his career at the club he started.

International career
Heijnen earned his one and only cap for the Netherlands in a September 1966 friendly match against Austria.

Retirement and death
After retiring as a player, Heijnen coached several amateur sides and ran a pub in Venlo.

He died on 18 March 2015 of esophageal cancer.

References

External links

 Player profile - VVV Venlo 

1940 births
2015 deaths
Association football wingers
Dutch footballers
Netherlands international footballers
Eredivisie players
VVV-Venlo players
ADO Den Haag players
San Francisco Golden Gate Gales players
MVV Maastricht players
Dutch expatriate footballers
Expatriate soccer players in the United States
Deaths from esophageal cancer
Deaths from cancer in the Netherlands
Footballers from Venlo